Llanfflewyn is a village in the community of Mechell, Ynys Môn, Wales, which is 141.9 miles (228.3 km) from Cardiff and 224.1 miles (360.6 km) from London. St Fflewin's Church, Llanfflewin is located here.

References

See also 
 List of localities in Wales by population

Villages in Anglesey